Coenagrion persicum is a species of damselfly in the family Coenagrionidae. It is found in Iran, possibly Iraq, and possibly Turkey.

References

Sources

Coenagrionidae
Insects described in 1993
Taxonomy articles created by Polbot